Pearse O'Brien (born 26 October 2004) is a professional footballer who plays as a midfielder for USL Championship club Hartford Athletic. Born in the United States, he represents Ireland at youth level.

Club career
Born in West Hartford, Connecticut, O'Brien began his career with U.S. Soccer Development Academy side Oakwood Soccer Club in 2016. While training with the Ireland youth sides, O'Brien attracted interest from both Scottish club Celtic and English club Fulham. After rising the ranks at Oakwood, O'Brien decided to join the youth setup at Major League Soccer club Real Salt Lake, joining the club's under-19 side.

On 15 May 2021, O'Brien made his professional debut for Real Salt Lake's USL Championship affiliate Real Monarchs against LA Galaxy II, coming on as a 69th minute substitute during the 2–0 defeat.

In February 2022, O'Brien joined Hartford Athletic on an academy contract.

International career
O'Brien is eligible to represent the United States and the Republic of Ireland, through birth and heritage, respectively. On 18 January 2020, O'Brien made his debut for the Republic of Ireland under-15 against the Australia under-17s.

Career statistics

References

External links
 Profile at U.S. Soccer Development Academy

2004 births
Living people
Sportspeople from Hartford County, Connecticut
Republic of Ireland association footballers
Republic of Ireland youth international footballers
American soccer players
American people of Irish descent
Association football midfielders
People from West Hartford, Connecticut
Real Monarchs players
USL Championship players
Soccer players from Connecticut
Hartford Athletic players